Fulden Ural (born 3 January 1991) is a Turkish women's volleyball player. Currently, she plays for Galatasaray with jersey number 10. She is a member of the Turkey women's national volleyball team.

Playing career

Club 

Ural began playing volleyball in the youth development section of İller Bankası Ankara. She then played in the clubs MKE Ankaragücü, Dicle University Diyarbakırspor, Ankara SGK, Gazi Üniversity, Trabzon İdmanocağı, Bolu belediyespor, and Samsun 19 Mayıs, before she joined Halkbank Ankara for the 2016–2017 season of the Turkish Women's Volleyball League.

She signed a one-year deal with Galatasaray on 12 August 2022.

International 
Ural is a member of the Turkey women's national volleyball team,  She takes part at the 2018 FIVB Volleyball Women's Nations League for Turkey.

References 

Living people
1991 births
Sportspeople from Ankara
Turkish women's volleyball players
İller Bankası volleyballers
Sosyal Güvenlik Kurumu volleyballers
Halkbank volleyball players
Turkey women's international volleyball players
Galatasaray S.K. (women's volleyball) players
Nilüfer Belediyespor volleyballers
Aydın Büyükşehir Belediyespor volleyballers
Beşiktaş volleyballers